Vivian Neptune Rivera (born in Fajardo, Puerto Rico) is a lawyer, academic, and current Dean of the University of Puerto Rico School of Law.  She graduated from Santiago Veve Calzada High School in Fajardo. Completed a B.A. in Economics and her J.D. from the University of Puerto Rico in Río Piedras, where she holds tenure, before obtaining a master of law (LLM) degree from Columbia University Law School in New York City.

References

 

Columbia Law School alumni
Deans of law schools in the United States
Women deans (academic)
Living people
People from Fajardo, Puerto Rico
Puerto Rican academics
Puerto Rican women lawyers
University of Puerto Rico alumni
Year of birth missing (living people)